Halil İbrahim Ergün (born 8 September 1946) is a Turkish stage, movie and television series actor.

He studied political science at Ankara University. Halil began his theater career in Bursa. Ergün debuted in cinema with director Yilmaz Güney in 1974. Ergün played in many important movies, including Maden, Kuma, Hamam and Kalbin zamanı. He has performed in more than 80 roles in theater and cinema. In 2006, he starred in the popular television series Yaprak Dökümü as Ali Rıza Bey.

Ergün was honored with "Best Actor" award in the theater and cinema, including from Golden Orange Film Festival in 1995 for "Böcek" and from Adana Golden Boll Film Festival in 1995 for "Böcek" and again in 1996 for "Mum Kokulu Kadınlar". He received an honorary lifelong achievement award in 2007 from Golden Orange Film Festival.

Works

Movies

Television series
Küçük ağa (1983)
Baba evi (1997–2001)
Pembe patikler (2002)
Büyük yalan (2004-2006)
Kırmızı Işık (2008)
Yaprak Dökümü (2006–2010)
Bana Sevmeyi Anlat (2016)
Misafir (2021)
Gönül Dağı (2022)

Screenplay
Merhaba (1976)
Kırlangıç fırtınası (1985)

Awards
 1995 "Best Actor" International Antalya Golden Orange Film Festival
 1995 "Best Actor" International Adana Golden Boll Film Festival
 1996 "Best Actor" International Adana Golden Boll Film Festival
 2007 "Life Achievement" International Antalya Golden Orange Film Festival

References

External links
 

1946 births
Living people
Golden Orange Life Achievement Award winners
Best Actor Golden Boll Award winners
Best Actor Golden Orange Award winners
Golden Butterfly Award winners
Turkish male film actors
Turkish male television actors
People from İznik
Ankara University Faculty of Political Sciences alumni
Haydarpaşa High School alumni